Dorcadion rufoapicipenne is a species of beetle in the family Cerambycidae. It was described by Breuning in 1946.

References

rufoapicipenne
Beetles described in 1946